Johan Randulf Rogge (16 June 1859 – ??) was a Norwegian politician for the Coalition Party.

He was elected to the Norwegian Parliament in 1907, representing the constituency Nygaard in Bergen. He worked as a merchant there, and was a member of Bergen city council for several years.

References

1859 births
Year of death missing
Members of the Storting
Coalition Party (Norway) politicians
Politicians from Bergen